WMAG (99.5 FM) is an adult contemporary music formatted radio station licensed to High Point, North Carolina and serves the Piedmont Triad region, including Greensboro and Winston-Salem. The iHeartMedia, Inc. outlet broadcasts with an ERP of 100 kW. It has studio facilities and offices located on Pai Park in Greensboro, and a transmitter site is near Randleman, North Carolina.

WMAG is one of North Carolina's most powerful stations, providing at least secondary coverage as far east as Raleigh, as far north as Martinsville, Virginia and as far south as the Charlotte suburbs.

History
The precursor to this station signed on in 1946 as WMFR-FM 97.7, a sister station of High Point's 1230 WMFR (We Make Furniture Right) or as some called it, We Make Frank Rich in recognition of the owner (Frank S. Lambeth). WMFR-FM later moved to 99.5.

In 1982, WMFR-FM was purchased by Voyager Communications and upgraded their facilities, becoming adult contemporary WMAG "Magic 99.5". During the 1980s and early 90s the station's competitors in the adult contemporary format were WWWB and WMQX. In later years, "Magic 99.5" repositioned to soft rock and dropped the "Magic" handle in favor of just the call sign. Voyager Broadcasting sold WMAG in the early 1990s to what would become AMFM Broadcasting. In 1999, Clear Channel Worldwide acquired the station. Its original transmitter site, still used by 1230 WMFR, is visible atop The Radio Building on Main St. in downtown High Point.

At the end of 2009, Bill Flynn ended a 26-year career as WMAG morning host when he moved to WPTI.

After the local classic hits station WTHZ "Majic 94.1" switched to a contemporary Christian format, WMAG added more 1970s' and 1980s' music in effort to gain some of the former WTHZ listeners.

Another local radio personality, Rod Davis, lost his job as the co-host on WMAG's morning show, on Wednesday October 26, 2011; when Clear Channel Communications announced that it had dismissed some on-air and off-air staff, within that same week, throughout the United States. The reason for the layoffs is to benefit in a reshaping of its regional and local programming that should enable it to seek out advertisers focused on areas wider than a single market.

On December 18, 2020, WMAG rebranded as "Mix 99.5".

Mix 99.5 is known as the Triad's Christmas station playing non-stop Christmas music starting in November through Christmas Day.

Previous logo

References

External links
Radio Building website

MAG
Mainstream adult contemporary radio stations in the United States
Radio stations established in 1946
1946 establishments in North Carolina
IHeartMedia radio stations